The 2009 ACB Playoffs was the final phase of the 2008–09 ACB season. It started on Saturday, May 16, 2009 and run until Thursday, June 18, 2009.

Quarterfinals
The quarterfinals were best-of-3 series.

TAU Cerámica vs. iurbentia Bilbao

TAU Cerámica wins the series 2–0

Regal Barcelona vs. Pamesa Valencia

Regal Barcelona wins the series 2–0

Unicaja vs. Kalise Gran Canaria

Unicaja wins the series 2–1

Real Madrid vs. DKV Joventut

Real Madrid wins the series 2–1

Semifinals
The semifinals were best-of-3 series.

TAU Cerámica vs. Real Madrid

TAU Cerámica wins the series 2–1

Regal Barcelona vs. Unicaja

Regal Barcelona wins the series 2–1

ACB finals
The finals are a best-of-5 series.

TAU Cerámica vs. Regal Barcelona

ACB Finals MVP:  Juan Carlos Navarro

External links 
 Official schedule and results

Liga ACB playoffs
Playoffs